Saint Barthélemoise may refer to:
 Something of, or related to Saint Barthélemy
 A person from Saint Barthélemy, or of Saint Barthélemoise descent. For information about the Saint Barthélemoise people, see Demographics of Saint Barthélemy.

See also